Lake Aricota (possibly from Aymara ari pointed, sharp, quta lake) is a lake in Candarave Province, region of Tacna, Peru.

Geography 
The lake originated when debris flows in steep canyon walls dammed the Callazas River. The waters of the lake are currently diverted to a hydroelectric plant, which has lowered the lake level from ~800.000 m3 in 1967 to a monthly average of 140.000 m3 in 2000. Main inflow sources of the lake are the Callazas River and the Jaruma creek. The main outflow is due to seepage through the debris dam to the Curibaya River (although hydroelectric use could count also).

Waters of Lake Aricota have a high arsenic content as the waters of Callazas River and Salado River (a tributary of Jaruma Creek) pass through the Yucamane volcanic area.

See also
List of lakes in Peru

References

Aricota
Aricota